Aegiphila villosa is a species of shrub in the family Lamiaceae. It is native to Guianas and Brazil. It grows primarily in wet tropical biomes.

References

villosa